Samuel Warren Rabb (born December 12, 1937) is a former American football quarterback who played for the Detroit Lions of the National Football League (NFL) and the Buffalo Bills of the American Football League (AFL). He was selected in the second round of the 1960 NFL Draft out of Louisiana State University (LSU). He completed his professional football career with the Montreal Alouettes of the Canadian Football League (CFL) in 1963.

He was the quarterback of the national championship winning 1958 LSU Tigers football team. He was named to the 1958 All-SEC football team by the Associated Press.

See also
 List of American Football League players

References

1937 births
Living people
American football quarterbacks
LSU Tigers football players
Detroit Lions players
Buffalo Bills players
Montreal Alouettes players
Players of American football from Baton Rouge, Louisiana
Sportspeople from Baton Rouge, Louisiana
American Football League players
Canadian football quarterbacks